The 41st Félix Awards were held on October 27, 2019, to honour achievements in Quebec music. The gala ceremony was hosted by Louis-José Houde, and televised by Ici Radio-Canada Télé.

Nominees were announced in September.

Nominees and winners

References

Felix
Felix
Felix
Félix Awards